The 2017–18 season of the FA Women's Premier League is the 26th season of the competition, which began in 1992. It sits at the third and fourth levels of the women's football pyramid, below the two divisions of the FA Women's Super League and above the eight regional football leagues.

The league features six regional divisions: the Northern and Southern divisions at level three of the pyramid, and below those Northern Division 1, Midlands Division 1, South East Division 1, and South West Division 1. 71 teams were members of the league before the start of the 2017–18 season, divided equally into five divisions of twelve teams, and one division of eleven teams. At the end of the season Blackburn Rovers and Charlton Athletic, respectively the champions of the Northern and Southern divisions, qualified for a Championship Play Off match against each other which Charlton Athletic won 2-1 thus becoming the overall National League Champion, and winning them promotion to the re-branded FA Women's Championship. As part of the restructuring of the top 4 tiers of women football by The Football Association, West Ham United was awarded promotion to the FA WSL, with Leicester City , Lewes, and Sheffield United awarded promotion to the FA Women's Championship.

Premier Division

Northern Division

Changes from last season:
Newcastle United was relegated to Northern Division One.
Wolverhampton Wanderers and Guiseley Vixens were promoted into the Northern Division from Midlands Division One and Northern Division One respectively.

League table

Results

Southern Division

Changes from last season:
League champions Tottenham Hotspur was promoted to FA WSL 2.
Chichester City and Gillingham were promoted from South West and South East Division One.

League table

Results

Championship play-off
The overall FA WPL champion will be decided by a play-off match to be held at the end of the season. The winner will also earn promotion to the FA WSL 2 subject to meeting licensing requirements.

Division One

Northern Division One

Changes from last season:
Guiseley Vixens was promoted to the Northern Division.
Newcastle United was relegated from the Northern Division.
Barnsley was promoted from the North East Regional League.
Bolton Wanderers was promoted from the North West Regional League.
Blackpool Wren Rovers and Tranmere Rovers were relegated to the regional leagues.
Leeds was renamed Leeds United.

League table

Results

Midlands Division One

Changes from last season:
Wolverhampton Wanderers was promoted to the Northern Division.
Burton Albion was promoted from the West Midlands Regional League.
Sheffield United was promoted from the East Midlands Regional League.
Loughborough Students was relegated to the regional leagues.

League table

Results

South East Division One

Changes from last season:
Gillingham was promoted to the Southern Division.
Haringey Borough was promoted from the Eastern Region League.
Leyton Orient was promoted from the London & South East Regional League.
Lowestoft Town was relegated to the regional leagues.

League table

Results

South West Division One

Changes from last season:
Chichester City was promoted to the Southern Division.
Southampton Women's was promoted from the Southern Region League.
Poole Town was promoted from the South West Regional League.
Exeter City was relegated to the regional leagues.
Shanklin withdrew from the league during the 2016–17 season.

 Basingstoke withdrew from the league in February 2018. All results involving Basingstoke were expunged.

League table

Results

Reserve Division

Reserve Northern Division

League table

Results

Reserve Midland Division

League table

Results

Reserve Southern Division

League table

Results

References

External links
Official website of the FA Women's Premier League
League results and standings

FA Women's National League seasons
2017–18 in English women's football
2017–18 domestic women's association football leagues